Northwest Arctic Borough is a borough located in the U.S. state of Alaska. As of the 2020 census, the population was 7,793, up from 7,523 in 2010. The borough seat is Kotzebue. The borough was formed on June 2, 1986.

Geography
By land area, it is slightly larger in total area than the state of Indiana.

Its coastline is limited by the Chukchi Sea. The Kotzebue Sound, a significant wildlife area, is a prominent water body within the Northwest Arctic Borough. The largest polar bear sighted in history, a male weighing , was sighted at Kotzebue Sound.

Adjacent boroughs and census areas
 North Slope Borough, Alaska - north
 Yukon-Koyukuk Census Area, Alaska - east
 Nome Census Area, Alaska - south

National protected areas
 Alaska Maritime National Wildlife Refuge (part of the Chukchi Sea unit)
 Chamisso Wilderness
 Bering Land Bridge National Preserve (part)
 Cape Krusenstern National Monument
 Gates of the Arctic National Park and Preserve (part)
 Gates of the Arctic Wilderness (part)
 Kobuk Valley National Park
 Kobuk Valley Wilderness
 Koyukuk National Wildlife Refuge (part)
 Noatak National Preserve (part)
 Noatak Wilderness (part)
 Selawik National Wildlife Refuge (part)
 Selawik Wilderness

Demographics

At the 2000 census, there were 7,208 people, 1,780 households and 1,404 families residing in the borough. The population density was 0.18 per square mile (0.47/km2). There were 2,540 housing units at an average density of 0 per square mile (0/km2). The racial makeup of the borough was 12.32% White, 0.21% Black or African American, 82.46% Native American, 0.89% Asian, 0.06% Pacific Islander, 0.36% from other races, and 3.70% from two or more races. 0.79% of the population were Hispanic or Latino of any race. 40.00% reported speaking Inupiat or "Eskimo" at home .

There were 1,780 households, of which 55.20% had children under the age of 18 living with them, 47.90% were married couples living together, 19.70% had a female householder with no husband present, and 21.10% were non-families. 16.60% of all households were made up of individuals, and 2.10% had someone living alone who was 65 years of age or older. The average household size was 3.87 and the average family size was 4.36.

Age distribution was 41.50% under the age of 18, 10.00% from 18 to 24, 28.10% from 25 to 44, 15.50% from 45 to 64, and 5.00% who were 65 years of age or older. The median age was 24 years. For every 100 females, there were 114.50 males. For every 100 females age 18 and over, there were 120.70 males.

2020 Census

Communities

Cities

Ambler
Buckland
Deering
Kiana
Kivalina
Kobuk
Kotzebue
Noorvik
Selawik
Shungnak

Census-designated places
Noatak
Red Dog Mine

See also

List of airports in the Northwest Arctic Borough

References

External links
Official website
Borough map: Alaska Department of Labor
Summaries of Division of Subsistence research projects in northwest Alaska / Division of Subsistence, Alaska Department of Fish and Game. hosted by the Alaska State Publications Program.
Subsistence wildlife harvests in five northwest Alaska communities, 2001-2003 : results of a household survey / by Kawerak, Inc., Maniilaq Association, and the Alaska Department of Fish and Game; by Susan Georgette ... [et al.]. Hosted by Alaska State Publications Program.

 
Chukchi Sea
1986 establishments in Alaska
Populated places established in 1986